KQOL (105.3 FM, "Kool 105.3") is a radio station broadcasting a classic hits music format. Licensed to Sleepy Hollow, Wyoming, United States, the station is currently owned by Keyhole Broadcasting, LLC.

References

External links

QOL
Classic hits radio stations in the United States
Campbell County, Wyoming
Radio stations established in 1977